Marek Roszczynialski (5 December 1917 – 12 May 1993) was a Polish equestrian. He competed in two events at the 1960 Summer Olympics.

References

External links
 

1917 births
1993 deaths
Polish male equestrians
Olympic equestrians of Poland
Equestrians at the 1960 Summer Olympics
People from Międzychód County